King's Health Partners  is an academic health science centre located in London, United Kingdom. It comprises King's College London, Guy's and St Thomas' NHS Foundation Trust, King's College Hospital NHS Foundation Trust and South London and Maudsley NHS Foundation Trust.

King's Health Partners' member organisations have a combined annual turnover of around £3.7 billion, treat over 4.8 million patients each year, employ approximately 40,000 staff and teach nearly 30,000 students. It forms one of the largest centres for healthcare education in Europe.

History
The four partners announced their intention to form an academic health science centre in April 2008. On 9 March 2009 the UK Department of Health announced that King's Health Partners would be one of six academic health science centres established in England.

Research

King's Health Partners incorporates some Medical Research Council centres, including the following:
 MRC-Asthma UK Centre in Allergic Mechanisms of Asthma
 MRC Centre for Developmental Neurobiology
 MRC Centre for Neurodegenerative Research
 MRC Centre for Social Genetic and Developmental Psychiatry
 MRC Centre for Transplantation
 MRC-HPA Centre for Environment and Health (awarded in 2009 in collaboration with Imperial College London)
 MRC National Institute for Medical Research (MRC NIMR) including the MRC Biomedical NMR Centre (planned to move to the new Francis Crick Institute in 2015, a partnership between the MRC, Cancer Research UK, Imperial College London, King's College London, the Wellcome Trust and University College London).

King's Health Partners' research is focused on the following key programme areas:

Allergy
Cancer
Cardiovascular
Dental
Dermatology
Diabetes
Inflammation and immunity
Neuroscience and mental health
Reproductive health
Stem cell

Hospitals

Teaching

King's College London GKT School of Medical Education provides core medical education at three King's Health Partners - Guy's Hospital, King's College Hospital and St Thomas' Hospital. King's Health Partners also collaborate with training and provide link education for other allied health professionals from other institutions.

References

Further reading

External links
 King's Health Partners
 Guy’s and St Thomas’ NHS Foundation Trust
 King's College Hospital NHS Foundation Trust
 King's College London 
 South London and Maudsley NHS Foundation Trust

King's College London
Academic health science centres